Immunoglobulin superfamily member 3 is a protein that in humans is encoded by the IGSF3 gene.

Function 
The protein encoded by this gene is an immunoglobulin-like membrane protein containing several V-type Ig-like domains. A mutation in this gene has been associated with bilateral nasolacrimal duct obstruction (LCDD). [provided by RefSeq, Jun 2016].

References

Further reading